Elias Fernandes de Oliveira (born 22 May 1992), known as Elias, is a Brazilian footballer who currently plays for Thai League 3 club Pattaya Dolphins United.

Career
On 16 January 2018, Hong Kong club Southern announced that they had signed Elias.

References

External links

1992 births
Living people
Brazilian footballers
K League 1 players
Hong Kong Premier League players
Busan IPark players
Perak F.C. players
Southern District FC players
Brazilian expatriate footballers
Expatriate footballers in South Korea
Brazilian expatriate sportspeople in South Korea
Expatriate footballers in Hong Kong
Association football forwards
People from São Bernardo do Campo
Footballers from São Paulo (state)